"Booty" is a song by American rapper Blac Youngsta. It was released on June 9, 2017, as the lead single from his mixtape I'm Innocent and his debut studio album 223. The track peaked at number 73 on the Billboard Hot 100.

Background
The single was originally featured on Blac Youngsta's June 2017 mixtape I'm Innocent. It was later featured on his debut studio album 223 in February 2018.

Music video
The music video for the track was released on February 6, 2018, and features a miniature version of himself in a strip club.

Remix
The remix was released on February 27, 2018 featuring Chris Brown, Trey Songz, and Jeezy.

Commercial performance
The track debuted at number 81 on the Billboard Hot 100, marking Blac Youngsta's Hot 100 debut. It later rose to number 73.

Charts

Certifications

References

2017 singles
2017 songs
Blac Youngsta songs
Epic Records singles